Pearl is the second and final solo album (and fourth album overall) by Janis Joplin, released on January 11, 1971, three months after her death on October 4, 1970. It was the final album with her direct participation, and the only Joplin album recorded with the Full Tilt Boogie Band, her final touring unit. It peaked at number one on the Billboard 200, holding that spot for nine weeks. It has been certified quadruple platinum by the RIAA.

Content
The album has a more polished feel than the albums she recorded with Big Brother and the Holding Company and the Kozmic Blues Band due to the expertise of producer Paul A. Rothchild and her new backing musicians.  Rothchild was best-known as the recording studio producer of The Doors, and worked well with Joplin, calling her a producer's dream. Together they were able to craft an album that showcased her extraordinary vocal talents. They used Sunset Sound Recorders in Los Angeles.

The Full Tilt Boogie Band were the musicians who accompanied her on the Festival Express, a concert tour by train of Canada, in the summer of 1970. Many of the songs on this album were recorded on the concert stage in Canada two months before Joplin and the band started their Los Angeles recording sessions. The band also appeared twice on The Dick Cavett Show.  They also played many American cities, both before and after Festival Express, although no recordings of those concerts have been officially released.

All nine tracks that she sings on were personally approved and arranged by Joplin. Pearl features the #1 hit "Me and Bobby McGee", on which she played acoustic guitar, written by Kris Kristofferson and Fred Foster; "Trust Me", by Bobby Womack, written for Joplin; Howard Tate's "Get It While You Can", showcasing her vocal range; and the original songs "Move Over" and "Mercedes Benz", the latter co-written by Joplin, Bobby Neuwirth, and Michael McClure.

Joplin sang on all tracks except "Buried Alive in the Blues", which was actually a backing track in which she had not yet recorded vocals. The song's writer Nick Gravenites was offered the opportunity to sing it as a tribute to Joplin, but he turned it down, so the song ended up as an instrumental. He later sang the song with Joplin’s former band Big Brother and the Holding Company for their 1971 album How Hard It Is. The recording sessions, starting in early September, ended with Joplin's untimely death on October 4, 1970. Her final session, which took place on Thursday, October 1 after a break of several days, yielded her a cappella "Mercedes Benz." It was the last song she recorded before her death.
The album cover, photographed by Barry Feinstein in Los Angeles, shows Joplin reclining on her Victorian era loveseat with a drink in her hand.

Release and reception

In 2003, the album was ranked number 122 on Rolling Stone magazine's list of The 500 Greatest Albums of All Time, moving to 125 in a 2012 revised listing. It was moved to a 259 ranking in the 2020 list.

Reissues
In 1993 Columbia reissued the album on 24kt gold CD as part of their MasterSound series, this edition was remastered by Vic Anesini using the Super Bit Mapping process. In 1999 it was remastered again for the Box Of Pearls box set, this version was also mastered by Vic Anesini, it included four previously unreleased live recordings from the Festival Express Tour, recorded on July 4, 1970, as bonus tracks; it was also released as a standalone release. A two-disc Legacy Edition was released on June 14, 2005, with six bonus tracks including a birthday message to John Lennon of "Happy Trails," and a reunion of the Full Tilt Boogie Band in an instrumental tribute to Joplin. The second disc included an expanded set from the Festival Express Tour, recorded between June 28 and July 4, 1970. The album was again reissued again in 2012 as The Pearl Sessions. It contains the original album, six mono mixes, two live tracks and alternate takes of the songs that constituted the Pearl vinyl album when Columbia Records released it in 1971. Recordings of Joplin and Paul Rothchild talking between takes give the listener insight into their creative musical process. In 2016 Mobile Fidelity Sound Lab released the album on SACD and double 45 RPM vinyl, the SACD was mastered by Rob LoVerde while the vinyl was cut by Kreig Wunderlich assisted by LoVerde.

Track listing

Personnel
Full Tilt Boogie Band
 Janis Joplin – vocals, acoustic guitar on "Me and Bobby McGee"
 Richard Bell – piano
 Ken Pearson – Hammond organ
 John Till – electric guitar
 Brad Campbell – bass guitar
 Clark Pierson – drums
Additional personnel
 Bobby Womack – acoustic guitar on "Trust Me"
 Bobbye Hall – bongos, congas,
 Phil Badella, John Cooke, Vince Mitchell – backing vocals
 Sandra Crouch – tambourine

Technical
 Paul A. Rothchild – producer
 Phil Macy – engineer
 Vic Anesini – mastering for 1999 reissue, 2005 Legacy edition and The Pearl Sessions 2012 edition
 Barry Feinstein, Tom Wilkes – photography & design for Camouflage Productions

Charts

Weekly charts

Year-end charts

Certifications

References

External links
 

1971 albums
Janis Joplin albums
Columbia Records albums
Albums produced by Paul A. Rothchild
Albums published posthumously
Albums recorded at Sunset Sound Recorders